Alphonse Michaux (1860–1928) was a Belgian coin engraver and medalist.

Michaux was born in Brussels on 15 December 1860. He was the son of Belgian engraver Robert Michaux (1824–1901), and as a young man studied at the Academy of Fine Arts in Brussels.

Career
Michaux was appointed chief engraver of the Brussels Mint (La Monnaie de Bruxelles) in 1895. As a coin designer, he is best known for engraving dies for a series of Belgian coins with a distinctive hole in the center. These coins started circulation in 1901 when 5 and 10 centimes coins were released. 

The 25 centimes coin was first released in 1908.   Michaux also engraved coins for Luxembourg, Iran, Romania, and Colombia. These coins are signed either "A. Michaux" or "A.M." on the obverse.

Medal designs
Michaux's medals include:

 1888 – Ville de Tournai Halle aux Draps Exposition 1888
 1891- Jean-Servais Stas Jubilaire (50 years)
 1894 – Jeton (28 mm) for Exposition Universelle d'Anvers
 1895 – Protection of Childhood
 1900 – Shah of Iran’s visit to the Brussels Mint
 1901 – 50th Anniversary of the Marriage of the Grand Duke of Luxembourg
 1902 – Birth of the 20th Century
 1903 – Centenary of the College of Luxembourg
 1905 – Jeton (30 mm) for Exposition Universelle de Liège
 1905 – Centenary of the Republic of Haiti
 1906 – 40th Anniversary of the Reign of Carol I of Romania
 1907 – Royal Numismatic Society of Belgium
 1908 – Hommage for Ch. Van Der Beken
 1910 – Jeton (30 mm) for visitors to the Brussels Mint (Monnaie de Bruxelles – Aujourd’hui)
 1912 – Art medal/pendant La Nage St. Gilles
 Circa 1914 – Albert Roi des Belges, Defenseur de Notre Territoire Nieuport Octobre 1914, WWI
 1916 - Elisabeth, Reine des Belges
 Circa 1918 -  WWI Memorial Medal/pendant A Nos Braves 1914 – 1918 La Saint Gilloise
 1926 -  Agriculture Exposition, Esschen
 Agriculture Award medal – Dairy Maid with Cow

References

Medallists
Artists from Brussels
1860 births
1928 deaths